Pupoidopsis is a genus of very small or minute air-breathing land snails, terrestrial pulmonate gastropod mollusks or micromollusks in the family Pupillidae.

Species
Species within the genus Pupoidopsis include:
 Pupoidopsis hawaiensis Cooke & Pilsbry, 1920 - type species

References

Pupillidae
Taxonomy articles created by Polbot